The National Cricket League is the oldest domestic first-class cricket competition in Bangladesh. It is contested by teams representing seven of the eight regional divisions of Bangladesh (there is no team from Mymensingh Division) as well as a team from the Dhaka metropolitan area.

History and format
The National Cricket League was inaugurated in the 1999–2000 season but was not then first-class. Bangladesh became the tenth Full Member of the ICC in 2000 and the league became first-class in the 2000–01 season. Limited-overs and Twenty20 tournaments with the same name have also been played in the past.

Since 2011–12 there have been eight teams in the league, which usually runs from October to December. From 2011–12 to 2014–15 each team played each other team once over the course of the season. Beginning in 2015–16 there has been a two-tier league: Rangpur, Khulna, Dhaka Division and Dhaka Metropolis were in the first tier in 2015–16, and Rajshahi, Sylhet, Barisal and Chittagong in the second; for the 2016–17 season Barisal were promoted to tier 1 and Rangpur demoted to tier 2; for the 2017–18 season Rangpur returned to tier 1 and Dhaka Metropolis were demoted to tier 2; for the 2018–19 season Rajshahi were promoted to tier 1 for the first time, and Dhaka Division were demoted to tier 2 for the first time.

The league is also known under its main sponsor's name. In 2015–16 it was officially the "Walton LED TV 17th National Cricket League". In October 2019 the Walton Group became the title sponsor of NCL for the next three years, and the league would be known officially as the "Walton NCL".

Teams

Winners
Winners of the National Cricket League in each season are: 
1999–2000 – Chittagong Division (NB: 1999–2000 was not a first-class competition)

2000–01 – Biman Bangladesh Airlines
2001–02 – Dhaka Division
2002–03 – Khulna Division
2003–04 – Dhaka Division
2004–05 – Dhaka Division
2005–06 – Rajshahi Division
2006–07 – Dhaka Division
2007–08 – Khulna Division
2008–09 – Rajshahi Division
2009–10 – Rajshahi Division
2010–11 – Rajshahi Division
2011–12 – Rajshahi Division
2012–13 – Khulna Division
2013–14 – Dhaka Division
2014–15 – Rangpur Division
2015–16 – Khulna Division
2016–17 – Khulna Division
2017–18 – Khulna Division
2018–19 – Rajshahi Division
2019–20 – Khulna Division
2020–21 – cancelled due to COVID-19 pandemic
2021–22 – Dhaka Division
2022–23 – Rangpur Division

National Cricket League One-Day winners

 2000–01 – Biman Bangladeshi Airlines (1/1)
 2001–02 – Sylhet Division (1/1)
 2002–03 – Khulna Division (1/1)
 2003–04 – Chittagong Division (1/1)
 2004–05 – Rajshahi Division (1/3)
 2005–06 – Rajshahi Division (2/2)
 2006–07 – Dhaka Division (1/2)
 2007–08 – Rajshahi Division (3/3)
 2008–09 – Barisal Division (1/1)
 2010–11 – Dhaka Division (2/2)

The National Cricket League one-day competition is no longer held. It has been superseded by the Dhaka Premier Division Cricket League as Bangladesh's List A competition.

National Cricket League Twenty20 Winners
 2009–10 – Rajshahi Division

See also
 Cricket in Bangladesh
 Bangladesh Cricket League

References

External links
 CricInfo Bangladesh domestic cricket
 National Cricket League at Bangladesh Cricket Board

First-class cricket competitions
Bangladeshi domestic cricket competitions